King Edward VI Camp Hill School may  refer to:

King Edward VI Camp Hill Schools, also known as Camp Hill Schools, the joint name for two adjacent twinned grammar schools that share a campus in Birmingham, England.The constituent schools are:
King Edward VI Camp Hill School for Boys, a boys' grammar school in Birmingham, England
King Edward VI Camp Hill School for Girls, a girls' grammar school in Birmingham, England